The Sisters of the Precious Blood (in Latin: Congregationis Sororum a Pretiosissimo Sanguine, English: sometimes referred to as Congregation sisters of the Most Precious Blood) is a female religious teaching and social congregation of pontifical right founded in Monza in 1874 and still headquartered there as of 2021. It is dedicated to teaching, charity and social works present in Italy, Brazil, Kenya, East Timor, Burma. In 2017, the congregation had 385 sisters in 55 communities.

History 
When it became clear that the community could not continue to work within the Canossian congregation because their rules didn't allow these sisters to have nuns from another class, in 1874 the group formed an autonomous religious congregation and Father Juste Pantalini, a barnabite, wrote new religious constitutions for them. The institute was recognized by diocesan right on May 17, 1876 by the Archbishop of Milan Luigi Nazari di Calabiana and received the approval of the Pope on July 10, 1934. In 1938, they opened up to the work of evangelization by helping the barnabites in missions in Pará. The foundress was recognized as venerable on April 28, 2006 and a sister of the Institute, Alfonsa Clerici, was beatified on October 23, 2011.

See also 

 Sisters of the Precious Blood
 École Saint-Joseph

External links 

 Official website: preziosine.it

References 

Religious identity
Religious organizations established in 1874
Catholic religious institutes established in the 19th century
Catholic teaching orders
Catholic female orders and societies